Dhruva Nakshatram is a 1989 Indian Telugu-language film directed by Y. Nageswara Rao and produced by K. Ashok Kumar under Sri Usha Art Productions. It stars Venkatesh and Rajani, with music composed by Chakravarthy. The film, released on 29 June 1989, was a box office hit.

Plot
Bharati Devi, a widow, lives in a town with her three children: two sons Dhruva Kumar, Narendra and a daughter Saroja. They live in a rented house and the landlord behaves badly with Bharathi Devi and robs her of all her money. Dhruva Kumar beats the landlord and runs away from home. After 25 years, Dhruva Kumar is a lorry driver in Bombay, Lalitha comes to Bombay for a job from Andhra and falls in love with him.

Lakshmipati and Mattigadala Manikyala Rao are big gangsters and Smugglers in Bombay, both are opponents. During a roadside fight, Dhruva Kumar catches Manikyala Rao's smuggled goods. Manikyala Rao traps Dhruva Kumar in a smuggling case and is caught by police, he offers to work with him, but Dhruva Kumar refuses his offer and runs away from Bombay with help of his friend Sivaji along with Lalitha and reaches Hyderabad, there he is arrested by police and submitted to the court, where he sees his mother Bharathi Devi and recognizes her. Lakshmipati frees out Dhruva Kumar when he agrees to work with him.

Dhruva Kumar tries to meet his family through his brother Narendra, who is a customs officer, and sister Saroja, but Bharathi Devi refuses to accept him. Narendra and Manikyala Rao's younger brother Mohan Rao are close friends, Manikyala Rao makes a plan to make Saroja's marriage with his younger brother, and Dhruva Kumar breaks out his plan and makes Saroja marriage with his friend Sivaji. Meanwhile, Narendra arrests Lakshmipati, and orders him to kill Narendra, but Dhruva Kumar protects him and becomes a rival to Lakshmipati also. Finally, Lakshmipati and Manikyala Rao join together to destroy Dhruva Kumar, they kidnap his entire family. Finally, Dhruva Kumar protects his family by sacrificing his life.

Cast

Venkatesh as Dhruva Kumar
Rajani as Lalitha
Satyanarayana as Lakshmipati
Sharada as Bharati Devi 
Gollapudi Maruti Rao as Lalitha's Father
Nutan Prasad as Mattigadala Manikyala Rao
Bhanu Chander as Narendra
 Siva Krishna as Shivaji
Rohini as Saroja 
Brahmanandam as Thief
Chalapathi Rao as Lakshmipati's Brother
Rallapalli as Kabirbal
Balaji as Mohan Rao
Fight Master Raju as Fighter 
Jaya Prakash Reddy as Varma
Jeeva as Rowdy
Master Rajesh as Childhood Dhuva Kumar
Baby Raasi as Childhood Saroja

Soundtrack
Music composed by Chakravarthy.

References

External links

1980s Telugu-language films
1989 films
Films scored by K. Chakravarthy